Pier Luigi Mazzoni (August 3, 1932 – July 12, 2012) was the Roman Catholic archbishop of the Roman Catholic Archdiocese of Gaeta, Italy.

Ordained to the priesthood in 1958, Mazzoni became a bishop in 1991 and retired in 2007.

Notes

Roman Catholic archbishops in Italy
Bishops of Gaeta
1932 births
2012 deaths